Jean de La Rochetaillée (died 1437) was a French churchman, eminent jurist, and Cardinal. His real name was Jean de Fort.

He was bishop of Saint-Papoul in 1413, bishop of Geneva in 1418, and bishop of Paris in 1421/2. He became archbishop of Rouen in 1423, but fell out with his chapter. From 1430/1 he was archbishop of Besançon.

He was created titular Patriarch of Constantinople in 1412, and Cardinal in 1426. He was Vice-Chancellor of the Holy Roman Church in 1436/7. Jean attended the Council of Basel from May 1433 to April 1435, functioning as the council's vice-chancellor too.

References

External links
Biography

1360s births
1437 deaths
Clergy from Lyon
15th-century French cardinals
Canon law jurists
Archbishops of Besançon
Bishops of Paris
Archbishops of Rouen
Bishops of Saint-Papoul
Year of birth unknown
Latin Patriarchs of Constantinople